The Japanese Formula 3 Championship is the 41st Japanese Formula 3 Championship season.

In August 2019, Japan Race Promotion, the series promoter, surrendered the right to organise a Japanese Formula 3 championship at the end of the season by choosing to deviate from the Formula Regional class and go to a Euroformula Open Championship-based formula, which will require the renaming of the series as Super Formula Lights from 2020 season onwards.  The FIA responded on 26 December 2020 by awarding the rights to organise a Formula Regional championship (as it will be renamed) to rival promoter K2, which promotes the F4 Japanese Championship.  Their series, the Formula Regional Japanese Championship, is the legal successor series under FIA standards and be the FIA-approved and JAF-sanctioned regional Formula 3 championship in 2020.

Teams and drivers

For the 2019 season, the National class was replaced by the Master class, aimed at older drivers not on the FIA Single Seater Pyramid.

Race calendar
Calendar for the 2019 season. All races are scheduled to be held in Japan.

Championship standings

Points are awarded as follows:

Drivers' Championships

Overall

Masters Class

Teams Championship

References

External links
  

Japanese Formula 3 Championship seasons
Formula Three
Japanese Formula 3
Japan F3